Omonadus formicarius is a species of antlike flower beetle in the family Anthicidae. It is found in the Caribbean, Central America, North America, Oceania, South America, and Europe.

References

Further reading

External links

 

Anthicidae
Articles created by Qbugbot
Beetles described in 1777